The Two Gladiators (also known as Fight or Die) is a 1964 Italian peplum film directed by Mario Caiano and starring Richard Harrison.

Plot
The Roman Emperor Marcus Aurelius dies, leaving the throne to his son Commodus, an arrogant thug who enjoys fighting as an amateur gladiator. Rome soon begins to suffer from Commodus' excesses, and his mistress Marcia tries to entice him towards a less dissolute lifestyle. In response, he discards her and forces his attentions on a chaste Roman aristocrat named Aemelia.

Unbeknownst to most of the world, Aurelius fathered twin sons; it was decided that one of them should be killed in order to prevent future contention over the throne. Tarruntius, the Roman Senator given this task, could not bear to take the infant's life and instead gave it to a foster family. Relocating Commodus' brother, who has grown up to be a fine Roman soldier under the name Lucius Crassus, Tarruntius encourages him to depose his reprehensible sibling and become the new Emperor. Commodus finds out about the plot, and orders his henchmen Laetus and Cleander to destroy the usurper.
Lucius and two of his army comrades make their way to Rome, where they try to stir up a revolt and evade Laetus's Praetorian Guards. During a brief interval in captivity, Lucius meets and falls in love with Aemelia, who has been imprisoned for refusing to become Commodus's new mistress. He takes her along when he escapes, and she becomes a partner in his adventures.

Unable to induce the populace of Rome to depose Commodus, Lucius personally confronts and kills his twin during a gladiatorial bout. The grateful Roman Senate name Lucius Emperor, and he uses his new power to reward his friends and helpers. Having done so, he abdicates in favor of a better man, the wise senator Pertinax.

Cast

 Richard Harrison as Lucius Crassus
 Moira Orfei as Marcia
 Mimmo Palmara as Commodus
 Alberto Farnese as Laetus
 Piero Lulli as Cleander 
 Mirko Ellis as Pertinax
 Enzo Fiermonte as General Octavius Craticus
 Ivy Holzer as Aemilia 
 Giuliano Gemma as Horatius
 Álvaro de Luna as Pannuntius
 Gianni Solaro as Tarruntius
 Adriano Micantoni as Pompeius
 Nello Pazzafini as Head of Decurions
 Renato Montalbano as Centurion

References

External links

The Two Gladiators at Variety Distribution

1960s historical adventure films
Peplum films
Films directed by Mario Caiano
Films about gladiatorial combat
Films set in ancient Rome
Films set in the Roman Empire
Films set in the 2nd century
Sword and sandal films
Cultural depictions of Commodus
1960s Italian-language films
1960s Italian films